James Bryan may refer to:

James Bryan (mining executive) (1789–1822), Missouri mining entrepreneur
James W. Bryan (1874–1956), U.S. Representative from Washington
James William Bryan (1853–1903), Lieutenant Governor of Kentucky
James E. Bryan (1909–2007), American librarian
Brother Bryan (1863–1941), American religious figure
Jimmy Bryan (1926–1960), American racecar driver
Jim Bryan (1931–2009), player and maker of the Northumbrian smallpipes
James Bryan (MP) for Hastings
James Bryan McCollum aka James Bryan, Canadian musician, songwriter and music producer

See also